Omphalodium is a genus of lichenized fungi within the Parmeliaceae family. The genus contains about four species found in North and South America.

References

Parmeliaceae
Lichen genera
Lecanorales genera
Taxa named by Julius von Flotow